Sandifer is a surname. Notable people with the surname include:

 Bill Sandifer (born 1952), American football player
 Cecil T. Sandifer {1923-2022), American politician and funeral director
 Dan Sandifer (1927–1987), American football player
 Phillip Sandifer (born 1959), American writer, recording artist and producer
 Robert Sandifer (1983–1994), American murder victim

See also
 Sandifer syndrome